Toledo West is an electoral constituency in the Toledo District represented in the House of Representatives of the National Assembly of Belize.

Area Representatives

References 

 

Political divisions in Belize
Toledo West
Belizean House constituencies established in 1984